State Route 113 (SR 113) is a state highway in western Georgia, United States. The  route connects US 27/SR 1 in Carrollton and Interstate 75 (I-75) in Cartersville.

Route description

SR 113 begins at an intersection with US 27/SR 1 in Carrollton. The highway travels north, intersects I-20, then travels through the town of Temple. In extreme eastern Haralson County, the route begins a concurrency with SR 120 traveling east, then travels concurrent with SR 101 northward. North of Yorkville, SR 101/SR 113 also travels concurrent with US 278/SR 6 to Rockmart. The highway departs Rockmart to the northeast. After crossing the Etowah River, the highway travels through downtown Cartersville as Main Street, before reaching its northern terminus at I-75 in the eastern part of Cartersville. SR 113 is usually marked as a north–south signed highway, but in areas like Taylorsville, the highway is signed as an east–west route. It is also signed as an east–west highway at its northern terminus at I-75.

Major intersections

See also

References

External links

 

113
Transportation in Carroll County, Georgia
Transportation in Haralson County, Georgia
Transportation in Paulding County, Georgia
Transportation in Polk County, Georgia
Transportation in Bartow County, Georgia